Bubuieci is a commune in Chișinău municipality, Moldova. It is composed of three villages: Bîc, Bubuieci and Humulești.

Bubuieci village marks its date of foundation as 22 April 1518, when the ruler of Moldova, Bogdan III the One-Eyed, transferred a deserted place near the Bîc River into the possession of Toader Bubuiog.  The name of the village is a modified form of the name of its founder.

References

Communes of Chișinău Municipality
Populated places established in 1518